Turkology (or Turcology or Turkic studies) is a complex of humanities sciences studying languages, history, literature, folklore, culture, and ethnology of people speaking Turkic languages and Turkic peoples in chronological and comparative context. This includes ethnic groups from the Sakha in East Siberia to the Turks in the Balkans and the Gagauz in Moldova.

History
Ethnological information on Turkic tribes for the first time was systemized by the 11th-century Turkic philologist Mahmud al-Kashgari in the Dīwān ul-Lughat it-Turk (Dictionary of Turkic language). Multi-lingual dictionaries were compiled from the late 13th century for the practical application of participants in international trade and political life. One notable such dictionary is the Codex Cumanicus, which contains information for Cuman, Persian, Latin, and German. There are also bilingual dictionaries for Kipchak and Armenian as well as Kipchak and Russuan. In the Middle Ages, Turkology was centred around Byzantine/Greek historians, ambassadors and travelers, and geographers.  In the 15th–17th centuries the main subject of Turkology was the study of the Ottoman Empire and the Turkish language, and the Turkic languages of Eastern Europe and Western Asia. In 1533 a first hand-written primer appeared, and by 1612 a printed grammar by Jerome Megizer was published, followed by F. Mesgnien-Meninski's four-volume  published in 1680.

P. S. Pallas initiated a more scientific approach to Turkology with his Comparative dictionaries of all languages and dialects (1787) which included lexical materials from Tatar, Mishar, Nogai, Bashkir, and other Turkic languages. In the 19th century, Turkology was further developed by M. A. Kazembek's Grammar of the Turkish-Tatar language (1839), O. N. Betlingk Grammar of the Yakut language (1851). A major achievement was the deciphering at the end of the 19th century of the Early Middle Age Orkhon inscriptions by V. Thomsen and W. W. Radloff (1895). By the end of the 19th century, Turkology developed into a complex discipline that included linguistics, history, ethnology, archeology, arts and literature. In the 20th century the Turkology complex included physical anthropology, numismatics, genetics, ancient Turkic alphabetic scripts, typology, genesis, and etymology, onomastics and toponymy. Scientific developments allowed calibrated dating, dendrochronology, metallurgy, chemistry, textile, and other specialized disciplines which contributed to the development of the Turkological studies. Deeper study of the ancient sources allowed better understanding of economical, social, mythological and cultural forces of the sedentary and nomadic societies. Linguistic studies uncovered pre-literate symbioses and mutual influences between different peoples.

Persecution in Soviet Russia

On 9 August 1944 the Central Committee VKP(b), the ruling party of the USSR, published an edict prohibiting "ancientization" of Turkic history. The edict was followed by a consecutive wave of mass arrests, imprisoning and killing of the Turkology intelligentsia, massive creation of replacement scientists, and re-writing of history pages on an industrial scale.

Many Turkology scholars in Russia were persecuted or imprisoned by Stalin's political oppression movement, the Great Purge, occurring during the 1930s–1940s, on the basis of disputed Islamic writings and publications. Other cultural Scholars, such as Egyptologists and Japanologists were also subject to the political repression, in Stalin's movement to cleanse Communist Russia of ethnic minorities that posed opposition to Communism.

Most Oriental and other cultural scholars that had been repressed in the 1930s and 1940s (as well as their respective scientific works) were, however, officially rehabilitated in or after 1956.

On the other hand, this edict brought unintended benefits to Turkology. One was the nearly immediate linguistic development of an alternate lexicon which replaced the nouns and adjectives containing the word Türk by a wealth of euphemisms: "nomads, Siberians, Paleosiberians, Middle Asians, Scythians, Altaians, Tuvians", etc. that filled scientific publications. The other was "writing into a drawer", when results of the years of fruitful work were written down for future publication. When the bonds relaxed, the publications exploded. Another was a flight of scientists from European Russia into remote areas, which brought first class scientists to many intellectually starved outlying areas of Middle Asia. Another one was connected with the statewide efforts to re-invent the history, when a wealth of Turkological facts were found in the process of search for "correct" history. And another one was a built-up of the public interest for the forbidden subjects, that resulted that no print size could satisfy the demand. L.N.Gumilev and O.Suleimenov inflamed a surge in the new generation of Turkology scholars.

With the physical culling of the scholars from the society, an organized a total extermination of all their published and unpublished works took place concurrently. Their books were removed from the libraries and destroyed from private collections by an intimidated population, articles and publications were culled, published photographs were retouched, private photographs were destroyed, published scientific references were erased, or publications with undesired references were destroyed. Very few of the early 20th century expedition diaries, ethnographical notes, reports and drafts for publications were ever recovered.

Turkology scholars persecuted in 20th-century Soviet Russia

 Я. В. Васильков, М. Ю. Сорокина (eds.), Люди и судьбы. Биобиблиографический словарь востоковедов – жертв политического террора в советский период (1917–1991) ("People and Destiny. Bio-Bibliographic Dictionary of Orientalists – Victims of the political terror during the Soviet period (1917–1991)"), Петербургское Востоковедение (2003). online edition
 Д.Д.Тумаркин (ed.), Репрессированные Этнографы, Вып. 1, М., Вост. лит., 2002 (Tumarkin D.D., "Prosecuted Ethnographers", Issue 1, Moscow, Oriental Literature, 2002)
 Tallgren A.M., 1936. Archaeological studies in Soviet Russia // Eurasia septentrionalis antiqua. X.
 А.А.Формозов, Русские археологи и политические репрессии 1920-1940-х гг. Институт археологии РАН, Москва, 1998 (Formozov A.A., "Russian archeologists and political repressions of the 1920-1940's", Russian Academy of Sciences Archeology Institute, Moscow, 1998)

Pseudoscientific theories

The field of Turkology has been heavily influenced by pseudoscientific theories often referred to as Pseudo-Turkology. Such theories contend that Turkic history stretches back hundreds of thousands of years, that every major civilization in history is of Turkic origin, and that major historical figures such as Jesus Christ and Genghis Khan were of Turkic origin. Though universally discredited in mainstream scholarship, pan-Turkic pseudoscientific theories have gained widespread support in many Turkic-speaking countries

List of Turkologists

 Abramzon, S. M. (1905–1977) (ethnographer)
 Abu al-Ghazi Bahadur (1605–1664) (historian, Turkologist)
 Adamovic M. (Uralic languages, Turkologist)
 Akhatov G. Kh. (1927–1986) (Professor of Philology, Turkologist, Linguist, Orientalist)
 Ahatanhel Krymsky (1871–1942) (Orientalist, Historian, Linguist, Philologist, Ethnographer
 Ahinjanov S. M. (1939–1991) (archeologist, historian, Turkologist)
 Akishev, K. A. (1924–2003) (archeologist, historian, investigated Issyk Kurgan)
 Altheim, F. (1898–1976) (historian)
 Amanjolov, A. S. (runiform writing)
 Anokhin, A. V. (1867–1931) (Turkologist, ethnographer, ancient musical arts)
 Aristov, N. A. (1847–1903) (Orientalist)
 Artamonov, M. (1898–1972) (Archaeologist, Turkologist, historian, Khazar studies)
 Asmussen, J. P. (1928–2002), (Orientalist, Manichaeism historian)
 Ayda Adile (1912–1992) (Etruscologist, Orientalist)
 Bacot, J. (1877–1965) (Orientalist)
 Baichorov S. Ya. (Turkologist, philologist, runiform writing)
 Bailey, H. W. (1899–1996) (Orientalist)
 Bang W. (Bang Kaup J. W., J. Kaup) (1869–1934) (Turkologist, linguist)
 Barfield T. J. (history, anthropology, and social theory)
 Bartold, W. W. (1869–1930) (Orientalist)
 Baskakov, N. A. (1905–1995) (Turkologist, linguist, ethnologist)
 Batmanov I. A. (Turkologist, philologist, runiform writing)
 Bazin Louis (Sinologist, orientalist)
 Beckwith, C. (Uralic and Altaic Studies)
 Benzing J. (1913–2001) (Turkic and northern Eurasia languages)
 Bichurin, N. Ya. (1777–1853) (Sinologist, orientalist)
 Bidjiev Kh. Kh.-M. (1939–1999) (archeologist, Turkologist)
 Bosworth, C. E. (Orientalist, Arabist)
 Bretschneider, E. (1833–1901) (Sinologist)
 Budberg, P. A. (Boodberg) (1903–1972) (Sinologist, orientalist)
 Çağatay, Saadet
 Castrén, M. A. (1813–1852)
 Chavannes, E. (1865–1918) (Sinologist)
 Chia-sheng, Feng (Jiasheng, Fen Tszia-shen, C. S. Feng) 
 Csirkés, Ferenc Péter (Orientalist) 
 Clauson, G. (1891–1974) (Orientalist, Turkish language)
  (Turkologist)
 de Guignes, Joseph (1721–1800) (Orientalist)
 Dal, Vladimir (1801–1872, Russian language lexicographer)
 Dilaçar, Agop (1895–1979) (linguist)
 Doblhofer E. (Historical philology,)
 Doerfer, G. (1920–2003) (Turkologist)
 Dolgih B. O. (1904–1971) (historian, ethnographer-Sibirologist)
 Donner, O. (1835–1909) (linguist)
 Drompp M. R. (Orientalist, Turkologist)
 Dybo, A. V. (Philologist, Turkologist, comparative linguist)
 Eberhard Wolfram (1909–1988) (Sinologist, Philologist, Turkologist)
 Erdal Marcel (linguist)
 Eren, H. (1919–2007) (linguist, Turkologist, Hungarologist )
 Fedorov-Davydov, G. A. (1931–2000) (archeologist)
 Frye, R. N. (philologist, historian)
 von Gabain, A. (1901–1993) (Turkologist, Sinologist, linguist, art historian)
 Gasratjan, M. A. (1924–2007) (historian, Turkologist, Kurdologist)
 Geng Shimin 耿世民 (Turkologist, Uighurologist, Manichaeanism, linguist, archeologist, historian)
 Gibbon, E. (1737–1794) (historian)
 Giraud, M. R. (1904–1968) (philologist, historian)
 Gökalp, Z. (1886–1924) (Sociologist)
 Golden, P. (historian)
 Golubovsky P. V. (1857–1907) (historian)
 de Groot, J. J. M. (1854–1921) (Sinologist)
 Grousset, R. (1885–1952)
 Gumilev, L. (Arslan) (1912–1992)
 Halasi-Kun Tibor (1914–1991) (Turkologist)
 Gustav Haloun (1898–1951)
 Hamilton, J. R. (linguist, Uighur and Chigil studies)
 Harmatta, J. (1917–2004) (linguist)
 Hashimoto Mantaro (1932－1987) (linguist, philologist, Sinologist; the influence of Altaic languages on Mandarin Chinese)
 Hazai, György (Turkologist, linguist)
 Heissig, W. (1913–2005) (Mongolist)
 Henning, W. B. (1908–1967)
 von Herberstein, S. (Siegmund, Sigismund, Freiherr von Herberstein, Gerbershtein) (1486–1566) (historian, writer, diplomat)
 Hirth, F. (1845–1927) (Sinologist)
 Howorth, H. H. (1842–1923) (archeologist, historian)
 Hulsewe, A. F. P. (1910–1993) (Sinologist)
 Ismagulov, Orazak (anthropologist)
 Jalairi Kadir Galy (Djalairi, Kadyrali, Kadyr Ali, Kydyrgali) (ca 1620) (historian)
 Jankowski Henryk (turkologist) 
 Jarring, G. (1907–2002) (Turkologist)
 Jdanko, T. (Zhdanko) (ethnographer)
 Johanson, L. (Turkologist)
 Kantemir, D. (Cantemir) (1673–1723) (historian, linguist, ethnographer)
 Khalikov, A. Kh. (1929–1994) (archeologist, historian, Turkologist)
 Khazanov, A. (social anthropologist and ethnologist)
 Kitsikis, Dimitri (political science)
 Klaproth, J. (1783–1835), (Orientalist, Linguist, Historian, Ethnographer)
 Köprülü, M. F. (Koprulu) (1890–1966)
 Korkmaz, Zeynep (Dialectologist)
 Kormushin, I. V. (Turkologist, philologist, runiform writing)
 Kotwicz, W. (1872–1944) (Orientalist)
 Kradin, N. N. (anthropologist, archaeologist)
 Küner, N. V. (1877–1955) (17-languages polyglot, Turkologist)
 Kurat, A. N. (historian) (1903–1971)
 Kvaerne, P. (Tibetology, Religions)
 Kyzlasov, I. L. (Turkologist, runiform writing)
 Lagashov, B. R. (Caucasology, philology)
 Laude-Cirtautas, Ilse (Turkology)
 von Le Coq, A. (1860–1930) (archaeologist, explorer)
 Liu Mau-tsai (Liu Guan-ying) (Sinologist, Turkologist)
 Lubotsky, A. (philologist)
 Maenchen-Helfen, O. J. (1894–1969) (academic, sinologist, historian, author, and traveler)
 Malov, S. E. (1880–1957) (Orientalist, runiform writing)
 Marquart, J. (Markwart) (1864–1930)
 McGovern W. M. (1897–1964) (Orientalist)
Mélikoff, Irène
 Ménage, V. L. (1920–2015) (British turkologist, historian)
 Mészáros, Gyula (1883–1957) (Hungarian ethnographer, Orientalist, Turkologist)
 Minorsky, V. F. (1877–1966) (Orientalist)
 Moravcsik, Gyula (1892–1972) (Byzantinology)
 Mukhamadiev, A. (Numismatist, orientalist, philologist)
 Müller, G. F. (Miller) (1705–83) (father of ethnography)
 Munkacsi, B. (1860–1937) (linguist)
 Nadelyaev, V. M. (Turkologist, philologist, runiform writing)
 Nasilov, D. M. (Turkologist, philologist)
 Németh, Gyula (1890–1976) (Turkologist, linguist)
 Ogel, B. (1923–1989) (Philology)
 Pallas, P. S. (1741–1811) (naturalist, ethnographer)
 Pelliot, P. (1878–1945) (Sinologist)
Peskov, Dmitry
 Pletneva, S. A. (archeologist)
 Podolak, Barbara (Turkologist, linguist)
 Polivanov, E. D. (1891–1938) (Founder of Altaistics, theorist in linguistics, Orientalist, polyglot) Поливанов, Евгений Дмитриевич 
 Poppe, N. N. (1897–1991) (linguist-Altaist)
 Potanin, G. N. (1835–1920) (Explorer, historian)
 Potapov, L. P. (1905–2000) (Turkologist, ethnographer, ethnologist)
 Potocki, Yan (or Jan) (1761–1815) (ethnologist, linguist, historian)
 Poucha, P. (Central Asian philology)
 Puech, H.-C. (linguist)
 Radloff, W. (1837–1918)
 Ramstedt, G. H. (1873–1950) (Altaic languages)
 Räsänen, Martti (Ryasyanen, M.)
  (1899–1984) (Turkologist)
 Rasovsky, D. A. (historian)
 Rémi-Giraud, S. (linguist)
 William of Rubruck (Dutch: Willem van Rubroeck, Latin: Gulielmus de Rubruquis) (traveller, ca. 1248–1252)
 Rochrig, F. L. O. (Roehrig) (1819–1908) (Orientalist, Turkologist, Native American linguist)
  (1884–1955) (Turkologist, Arabist, Iranist, historian and linguist)
 Samoilovich, A. N. (1880–1938, killed in Stalinist repressions) (Orientalist, Turkologist)
 Samolin, W. (1911–1972?) (Orientalist)
 Senigova, T. N. (Fine Arts, Turkologist)
 Sergi Jikia (1898–1993) (Historian and orientalist, founder of the Turkology in Georgia)
 Seydakmatov, K. (Turkologist, runiform writing)
 Shcherbak, A. M. (1926–2008) (Turkologist, runiform writing)
 Siemieniec-Gołaś, Ewa (Turkologist, linguist)
 Smirnova, O. I. (numismatist)
 Stachowski, Marek (linguist, etymologist)
 Stachowski, St. (linguist)
 Starostin, S. (1953–2005) (linguist, Altaic languages hypothesis)
 von Strahlenberg, P. J. (Philip Johan Tabbert) (1676–1747)
 Tekin, Talât (Altaic languages)
  (1921–2004) (linguist, Central Asian philology)
 von Tiesenhausen, W. (1825–1902) (Orientalist, numismatist, archeologist)
 Tietze, Andreas (1914–2003; Turkologist)
 Thomsen, Vilhelm (1842–1927) (Danish linguist, decipherer of the Orkhon inscriptions)
 Togan, Zeki Velidi (1890–1970) (historian, Turkologist, leader of liberation movement)
 Sergey Tolstov (1907–1976) (archeologist)
 Tremblay, X. (philology)
 Vainberg, B. I. (archeologist, numismatist)
 Vaissière, Étienne de la (Orientalist, philologist)
 Valihanov, Chokan (Shokan, Chokan Chingisovich) (1835–1865) (Turkologist, ethnographer, historian)
 Vambery, A. (1832–1913)
 Vandewalle, Johan
 Vasiliev, D. D. (Türkic runiform script)
 Velikhanly, N. M (Velikhanova) (Orientalist)
 Velyaminov-Zernov, V. V. (1830–1904) (Turkologist)
 Wang Guowei (王国维, 1877–1927) (Sinologist, historian, philologist)
 Wikander, S. (1908–1983) (Orientalist, philologist, Native American linguist) Stig Wikander
 Wittfogel, K. A. (1896–1988) (Sinologist, historian)
 Yadrintsev, N.V. (1842–1894) (archeologist, Turkologist, explorer)
 Yudin, V. P. (1928–1983) (Orientalist, historian, and philologist)
  (1903–1970) (Turkologist)
 Zakiev, M. (Philologist)
 Zehren, E.  (Orientalist, archeologist)
 Vásáry, István (Turkologist, historian)
 Zhirinovsky, V. V. (Turkologist, philologist, politician)
 Zieme, P. W. H. (Turkologist, linguist)
 Zuev, Yu. (1932–2006) (Sinologist)

Related periodical publications

A selection of English-language periodicals studying Turkology
 Journal of Turkic Languages
 Journal of Turkish Linguistics
 Journal of Turkology
 Journal of the American Oriental Society
 Journal of Asian Studies
 British Society for Middle Eastern Studies
 The Turkology Update Leiden Project(TULP)
 Journal of American Studies of Turkey
 Turkologischer Anzeiger/Turkology Annual
 Indiana University Central Eurasian Studies

See also 
 Institute of Turkish Studies
 Ottoman studies

References

 Kononov A.N., editor, "Bibliographical dictionary of native Turkologists. Pre-USSR period", Moscow, Science, 1974 – Кононов А.Н., ред., "Биобиблиографический словарь отечественных тюркологов. Дооктябрьский период"; Москва, Наука, 1974 (In Russian). Brief biographical and bibliographical compendium of more than 300 Turkologists in Russia, who contributed to the development of Turkology and education in Türkic languages from the 18th century to 1917.
 Starostin, Sergei/Dybo, Anna/Mudrak, Oleg, "Etymological Dictionary of the Altaic Languages" ("Этимологический Словарь Алтайских языков"), 3 vols, Leiden and Boston 2003

External links
 İstanbul Kültür University
 International Turkology and Turkish History Research Symposium
 SOTA Research Centre for Turkestan and Azerbaijan
 ATON at Texas Tech University
 Turkish Studies Institutes, Departments Links
 Turuz – Online Turkic Dictionaries
 Turklib – Turkistan Library
 Bibliography of Turkic linguistics//Monumenta Altaica http://altaica.narod.ru/bibliograf/e_turkmeng.htm (period 1810–2003)

 
Area studies
Cultural studies